Security Insurance Company (SIC) was a security and insurance company in Bulgaria. Thought to be a front for a criminal organisation. SIC, along with its rival VIS, was made up primarily of ex-wrestlers, policemen and members of the security apparatus. As well as extortion rackets, the groups also worked in "car insurance" and theft. The capital they earned in the emerging Bulgarian economy of the 1990s allowed them to build huge influence amongst the government.

See also
VIS (criminal organisation)
Bulgarian Mafia

References

Organized crime groups in Bulgaria
Insurance companies of Bulgaria
Security companies of Bulgaria
Defunct companies of Bulgaria